Thomas More in Prison, Visited by His Wife and Daughter or Thomas More en prison (and various other titles) is a history painting of 1828 by Claudius Jacquand.  It depicts Thomas More in prison, with his wife and daughter. It has been in the collection of the Musée des Beaux-Arts de Lyon since soon after it was completed.

In 2014 it formed part of the exhibition L'invention du Passé. Histoires de cœur et d'épée 1802-1850.

References

French paintings
1828 paintings
History paintings
Paintings in the collection of the Museum of Fine Arts of Lyon
Fiction set in the 1530s
Cultural depictions of British men
Cultural depictions of writers